Tiger Woods PGA Tour 2001 (also known as Tiger Woods PGA Tour Golf for the PlayStation version) is a sports video game developed by Headgate Studios for the Microsoft Windows version, Stormfront Studios for the PlayStation version, and EA Redwood Shores for the PlayStation 2 version, and published by EA Sports for Windows and PlayStation in 2000 and PlayStation 2 in 2001. The latter console version was ported to Japan and published by Electronic Arts Victor on June 21, 2001.

Reception

The game received "mixed or average reviews" on all platforms according to video game review aggregator Metacritic.

The PC version sold 230,000 units in the U.S. and earned $5.5 million by August 2006, after its release in November 2000. It was the country's 92nd best-selling computer game during this period.

Notes

References

External links

2000 video games
EA Sports games
Golf video games
Multiplayer and single-player video games
PlayStation (console) games
PlayStation 2 games
Stormfront Studios games
Tiger Woods video games
Video games developed in the United States
Windows games